In enzymology, a methylaspartate mutase is an enzyme that catalyzes the chemical reaction

L-threo-3-methylaspartate  L-glutamate

Hence, this enzyme has one substrate, L-threo-3-methylaspartate, and one product, L-glutamate.

This enzyme belongs to the family of isomerases, specifically those intramolecular transferases transferring other groups.  The systematic name of this enzyme class is L-threo-3-methylaspartate carboxy-aminomethylmutase. Other names in common use include glutamate mutase, glutamic mutase, glutamic isomerase, glutamic acid mutase, glutamic acid isomerase, methylaspartic acid mutase, beta-methylaspartate-glutamate mutase, and glutamate isomerase.  This enzyme participates in c5-branched dibasic acid metabolism.  It employs one cofactor, cobamide.

Structural studies

References

 
 

EC 5.4.99
Cobamide enzymes
Enzymes of known structure